Yeşiloba is a mahalle in the Seyhan district of the city of Adana. The neighborhood is situated on both sides of D400 state road, 8 km west of the historical downtown.

Governance
Yeşiloba is a mahalle and it is administered by the Muhtar and the Seniors Council.

Demographics
The population of Yeşiloba as of December 31, 2014 is 15,065.

Economy
Yeşiloba mahalle is surrounded by industrial areas, therefore most of the residents work at the factories around.

Transport
Major transportation link of the Yeşiloba mahalle is the Şehitlik railway station within the borders of the neighborhood. 

Adana Metropolitan Municipality Bus Department (ABBO) has bus routes from Yeşiloba to downtown Adana.

References

Neighborhoods/Settlements in Adana